Kalamian may refer to:

Kalamian languages, or Calamian languages, a small cluster of languages spoken in the Philippines:
Kalamian Tagbanwa, or Calamian Tagbanwa language, a language spoken on Palawan Island in the Philippines
Rex Kalamian, American basketball coach of Armenian descent

See also
Kalam (disambiguation)